Pierre-Édouard is a French compound given name, composed of Pierre and Édouard. Notable people with the name include:

 Pierre-Édouard Bellemare (born 1985), French ice hockey right winger
 Pierre-Édouard Lémontey (1762–1826), French lawyer, politician, scholar and historian
 Pierre-Édouard Plucket (1759—1845), French Navy officer and privateer

Compound given names
French masculine given names